Roosevelt Glacier is located on the north slopes of Mount Baker in the North Cascades of the U.S. state of Washington. In the middle of its course, Roosevelt Glacier is connected to Coleman Glacier to its south.

See also 
List of glaciers in the United States

References 

Glaciers of Mount Baker
Glaciers of Washington (state)